South Florida Bulls basketball could refer to:

 South Florida Bulls men's basketball
 South Florida Bulls women's basketball